The Manouane River flows from west to east in the Haute-Mauricie (Upper-Mauricie), at northwest of La Tuque, in the administrative region of Lanaudière and Mauricie, in the Province of Quebec, Canada. The river basin is mostly covered by forest.

Geography 

Manouane River is one of the five major tributaries of the Saint-Maurice River, where it discharges opposite to the village of Wemotaci, located about 115 km north of La Tuque in Upper Mauricie. The mouth of Manouane River is located between Chute Allard dam and Gouin reservoir dam (at the head of Saint-Maurice River).

Manouane River quenches including several large bodies of water, such as lakes Châteauvert, Manouane and Kempt.

The White River (La Tuque) (flowing north-east and north-south at the end of his course) is the main tributary of the Manouane River; it discharges on the left bank at 1.6 km from the mouth of the Manouane river. The watershed of the White River (La Tuque) covers the area north of the Manouane river basin.

Toponymy 

The name "Manouane" (La Tuque) is of Native American origin was officially registered on December 5, 1968, at the Bank of place names of the Commission de toponymie du Québec (Geographical Names Board of Québec)

See also 

 La Tuque
 Saint-Maurice River
 Lake Manouane
 Châteauvert Lake (La Tuque)
 Lake Manouane
 Kempt Lake (Matawinie)
 Mauricie
 Manawan, Canadian Indian reserve

References 

Rivers of Mauricie
Landforms of La Tuque, Quebec
Tributaries of the Saint-Maurice River